John M. T. Ford is an English general practitioner physician and president of the History of Medicine Society of the Royal Society of Medicine from 1987 to 1988. His writings on medical history include "Medical Indications for Taking the Waters of Tunbridge Wells" (1984) and "R. E. Ford CBE, MD, MRCP" (1995). He is active in the Worshipful Society of Apothecaries.

Selected publications

References

Presidents of the History of Medicine Society
British medical historians
Year of birth missing (living people)
British general practitioners
Living people